Ipswich railway station is located on the Main line in Queensland, Australia. It serves the urban centre of Ipswich.

History

The first railway station opened in Ipswich in 1865. It was the first railway station built in Queensland, as the first terminus for the 34 kilometre section of the Main line from Grandchester. In 1887, the station was completely rebuilt.

Two pieces of associated historic railway infrastructure are the:
 Railway Signal Cabin and Turntable which enabled trains to be turned onto different railway lines
 Bremer River Rail Bridge which connected the station to the North Ipswich Railway Workshops
The cabin, turnable, rail bridge and railway workshops are all listed on the Queensland Heritage Register.

In 1978, a large office and retail complex (currently known as Ipswich Central Plaza) was built above the station and spanning both sides of Bell Street following the sale of the air rights. On 20 September 1980, the line was electrified from Darra. The last remaining old platform and buildings were demolished in 1985.

Services
Ipswich is served mainly by trains to and from Caboolture and Nambour, and is the terminus for the Rosewood shuttles. Some inbound services originate from Rosewood in the morning on-peak, and some outbound services continue to Rosewood in the afternoon peak.

The Caboolture and Nambour trains outside of peak times typically stop all stations to Bowen Hills, then run express from Bowen Hills to Petrie, stopping only at Eagle Junction and Northgate. During weekday morning on-peak times, the trains also run express from Darra to Milton, stopping only at Indooroopilly. Some weekday services continue past Petrie to Kippa-Ring instead of Caboolture or Nambour.

During morning on-peak times (6:00 am – 8:30 am, Monday to Friday), city bound services depart every six minutes at best, and during afternoon peak times (3:30 pm – 7:00 pm, Monday to Friday), terminating services arrive every 12 minutes at best. During off-peak times, Caboolture and Nambour services depart and arrive at half hourly intervals, with every second train being met by a Rosewood shuttle train. Weekday morning on-peak express services take 50 minutes to reach Central, and 58 minutes to reach Central on an off-peak all-stations service.

Ipswich is also served by Queensland Rail Travel's twice weekly Westlander service travelling between Brisbane and Charleville.

Services by platform

The station has two island platforms. One (Platforms 3 and 4) is usually only used during peak periods.

Services by platform

Transport links
Westside Bus Company operates nine routes from the Bell Street bus station, directly adjacent to Ipswich station:
500: Riverlink Shopping Centre to Goodna
502: Bundamba to Riverlink Shopping Centre via Blackstone
503: Bundamba to Riverlink Shopping Centre via Eastern Heights
506: Riverlink Shopping Centre to Leichardt & One Mile
509: Yamanto to Riverlink Shopping Centre
512: Brassall to Riverlink Shopping Centre
514: Moores Pocket to Booval
515: Brassall to Yamanto & Willowbank
529: to Toogoolawah via Lowood

References

External links

Ipswich station Queensland Rail
Ipswich station Queensland's Railways on the Internet
[ Ipswich station] TransLink travel information

Ipswich, Queensland
Railway stations in Ipswich City
Railway stations in Australia opened in 1865
Main Line railway, Queensland